Elise Foniyama Thiombioano Ilboudo is an archaeologist and politician in Burkina Faso.

Since January 10, 2020, she has been Burkina Faso's Minister of Culture, Arts, and Tourism. She has been affiliated with the People's Movement for Progress.

References

Women government ministers of Burkina Faso
Burkinabé academics
Living people
Year of birth missing (living people)
21st-century Burkinabé people
Government ministers of Burkina Faso
Women archaeologists
21st-century archaeologists